Monea Castle is a castle in Monea, County Fermanagh, Northern Ireland. It is a State Care Historic Monument sited in the townland of Castletown Monea, in Fermanagh District Council area, at grid ref: H1647 4937.

History
Monea Castle is situated where a Maguire castle would have been based prior to the Plantation and a crannog is still visible. Building begain in 1616. It had a bawn built later, in 1622. It was attacked by Rory Maguire during the Irish Rebellion of 1641 when the castle was sheltering Protestant settlers.

See also
Castles in Northern Ireland

See Bill Wilsdon's "Plantation Castles on the Erne" for more information

Notes

References

Monea Castle
Ireland's Eye - Monea Castle

Buildings and structures completed in 1622
Castles in County Fermanagh
Ruined castles in Northern Ireland
1622 establishments in Ireland